Seattle Erotic Art Festival was founded in 2002 by the Center for Sex Positive Culture. It is now the flagship program of the nonprofit Foundation for Sex Positive Culture.

The Festival supports a vibrant creative community, promotes freedom of expression, and fosters sex-positive culture through public celebration of the arts.

It is an annual weekend-long event, and  showcases erotic art in diverse media including painting, photography, sculpture, film, literature, and interactive installations. A wide range of performance art is also represented, including burlesque, ballroom dance, circus arts, and live music.

The Festival also features an expansive store which sells original works, prints, oddities, collectibles and related merchandise from contributing artists.

Subject matter
Art in the Festival is intended to celebrate the entire gamut of erotic expression, including surrealist imagery, gender politics, homoeroticism, and BDSM, among many others.

2011
The 2011 Seattle Erotic Art Festival took place Thursday, May 19 through Sunday May 22 at the Fremont Studios located in Fremont, Seattle, Washington. The theme for the 2011 event was "Red light district" and was expected to draw thousands of patrons.

2011 exhibition
2011 was the first year that two artists placed in both the Jury Awards and the Viewer's Choice.

The jury winners were:
 Assaf Ziv, Pool 8
 David Peterman, Common Thread
 Michael Lynn, Perhaps

The viewers' choice winners were:
 David Peterman, Common Thread
 Michael Lynn, Perhaps
 Jim Wilkinson, Naked Truth (Installation)

2010
The 2010 Seattle Erotic Art Festival occurred April 30 through May 2, 2010 at the Seattle Center Exhibition Hall in Seattle, Washington. It opened the Cabinet of Curiosities, showcasing visual, performance and literary art, interactive installations, film, after parties, workshops, and a museum-quality Festival Store. Creative inspiration was drawn from 17th century Europe, when the wealthy and the well-traveled collected beautiful, grotesque and obscure things into encyclopedic collections known as "cabinets of curiosities." In the Festival's erotic interpretation, the cabinet held a fantastical celebration of the arts.

Visual Art

The Festival showcased a world-class visual art exhibition. Festival jurors and curators selected a variety of art from over 1,600 entries submitted by more than 400 artists. “We’re excited to present a comprehensive collection of international art, diverse in medium, sexual proclivities, body type, age, ethnicity, and gender,” says Festival Director Anna Hurwitz.

Performance

The 2010 Festival included an original theatrical production entitled Cabaret de Curiosités, written and directed by award-winning NYC-based director Roger Benington.  This piece was produced in collaboration with locally and nationally recognized performance artists, including an original score composed by John Woods from The Wet Spots.

Interactive Installations	

The Festival offered its first grant to artists to create interactive art installations. Audience members were invited to help artist Nancy Peach complete a massive canvas; to write and receive love letters in a special bedroom designed by award-winning artist Ellen Forney and Jacob Peter Fennell; to lounge on luxurious metalwork beds and to engage the art in many other ways.

Literary Art

Returning for its second year, the Literary Art Showcase presented jury-selected poems, short stories and plays in intimate readings.  The Festival spotlighted Naked Girls Reading on Friday and Saturday nights.

More information about the Festival is available at www.SeattleErotic.org.

2010 Artists
The eighth annual Festival was bigger than ever before, drawing together locally and nationally acclaimed artists to celebrate the diverse forms of eroticism and human sexual expression. All media are represented - including film, which was first featured in 2003.

The jurors for the 2010 year were Jen Graves, Daniel Carrillo, Dianne Elliott and Sharon Arnold, with guest curator Chris Crites.

2009
The seventh annual Festival drew together a comprehensive collection of international contemporary fine art that celebrated the wide diversity of human sexual expression and the incredible creativity with which artists approach the subject of erotica. All media were represented: painting, photography, sculpture, assemblage, prints, installation, mixed media and more. Artists were selected by a panel of jurors or invited to exhibit by Festival curators.

Marita Holdaway (owner Benham Gallery), Jena Scott (director artReSource Gallery) and Jerry Slipman (owner Pacini Lubel Gallery), graciously served as the 2009 Festival jury. Artist and writer Sharon Arnold served as Guest Curator. They selected work based on quality of execution, originality of subject and depth of emotion from more than 2,000 pieces submitted by hundreds of artists worldwide."

External links
 Seattle Erotic Art Festival homepage
 Seattle Erotic Art Festival Artist Portal
 Center for Sex Positive Culture homepage
 Foundation for Sex Positive Culture homepage
 Truly Fallen Designs featured in the Festival store
 Fremont Studios

References

Erotic events
Festivals in Seattle
Erotic art